Albert James Endress (born February 18, 1929) is a former American football defensive end who played for the San Francisco 49ers. He first played college football at Saint Mary's College of California before transferring to San Francisco State University. He attended St. Elizabeth High School in Oakland, California.

References

Living people
1929 births
American football defensive ends
Saint Mary's Gaels football players
San Francisco State Gators football players
San Francisco 49ers players
Players of American football from Oakland, California